Drosera capensis, commonly known as the Cape sundew, is a small rosette-forming carnivorous species of perennial sundew native to the Cape in South Africa. Because of its size, easy to grow nature, and the copious amounts of seed it produces, it has become one of the most common sundews in cultivation, and thus, one of the most frequently introduced and naturalised invasive Drosera species.

Description

It is a perennial, herbaceous plant that forms a rosette with a diameter of 18 to 25 cm and is characterized by numerous, reddish glandular erosions on 7 cm long and 5 mm wide, elongated leaves.

The plant flowers in summer (December and January in its native habitat in South Africa) with up to 50 pale-violet, more than 2 cm large flowers borne on up to 35 cm high racemose inflorescences. The flowers can self-pollinate upon closing and produce copious quantities of very small, spindle-shaped seeds, which are released from the capsules that form when the flowers have died. The plant thrives in full sun locations on nutrient-poor, waterlogged and lime-free soils.

Prey catching

When insects are first trapped, the leaves roll lengthwise toward the center. This aids digestion by bringing more digestive glands in contact with the prey. The plant leaf surrounds the prey within an hour while tentacles continue to move to further trap the prey. Digestion takes well over 6 hours after a prey's original ensnarement. The plant has a tendency to retain the dead leaves of previous seasons, and the main stem of the plant can become quite long and woody with time.

The plant captures their prey by luring it through the dazzling digestive secretions produced on the tentacles of the leaves. The secretion acts as a visual signal, as it shines in the sun and through the red tentacle tip, and is also a chemical attractant that attracts insects.

If a victim has been caught in the secretion of the tentacles, then the tentacles near the victim will bend towards it, until a portion of the tentacle-covered region of the leaf has wrapped around the animal. Secreted enzymes will digest the insect until only the chitin remains. The absorption of nutrients takes place via the red tentacle tips, where the secretion itself is produced. If the victim is decomposed enough that the plant can not gain further nutrients, the leaf and the tentacles return to their original position.

The sundew secretes mucin to trap prey items – often insects and arthropods. The mucin is approximately 4% of an acidic polysaccharide in an aqueous solution with a pH of approximately 4. Fresh mucin can be stretched up to a meter in length thread. The mucin secretions of Drosera capensis has a high viscosity - this suggests that the mucin contains a predominant composition of acidic polysaccharide that interact extensively and are highly hydrated.

Drosera capensis has two color forms; red and white. When fruit flies were introduced to the two differently colored plants, there was no difference between the means of the flies captured. Fruit flies seemed to have no preference over the color of the plant. Increased photosynthesis was observed when fed with fruit flies. Previously, it has been hypothesized that plant coloration has been used to attract prey items along with olfactory signals. This hypothesis has been disproven in Drosera capensis white and red forms as coloration is due to anthocyanin - or the lack of – and does not affect the UV coloration of the plant which, along with olfactory signals, attracts prey items.

Reproduction
Flowers individually open in the morning and close by mid afternoon, lasting just one day each with the next one up the scape opening the following day; the lower ones on the scape can thus be open or "past" while the ones at the top are still forming.

Under horticultural conditions, carnivorous plant enthusiasts find that these seeds have a tendency to find their way into neighbouring plant pots where they germinate readily, giving D. capensis a reputation as a weed.

Cultivation

Drosera capensis has several forms or varieties, including the "typical", "wide-leaved", "narrow-leaved" and "red" forms and the cultivar Drosera 'Albino'. The typical form is noted for wider leaves and the gradual production of a scrambling stem as it grows. The "wide-leaved" form is similar to the "typical" variety, but produces leaves at least 50% wider than the typical variety. The narrow-leaved form differs from the typical form in that it rarely produces tall stems; has thinner, longer leaves and less hair on the plant. Drosera capensis 'Albino', is also similar in shape to the "typical" form, but lacks most of the red pigmentation of the typical or narrow forms, with clear or pink trichomes and white flowers. There is also the "red" form that turns blood red in full sunlight, and is also similar physically to the narrow-leaved form. These varieties are commercially available.

Drosera capensis "narrow-leaved" has won the Royal Horticultural Society's Award of Garden Merit.

Drosera capensis can be easily propagated through a variety of methods including seed, leaf cuttings, and root cuttings.  It is not easily killed by temperature extremes of a short duration, and is generally a forgiving plant to grow.  Additionally, D. capensis does not undergo dormancy like some sundews. It is among the easiest of carnivorous plants to keep indoors. It grows very well in open air, on a sunny windowsill, as long as it is kept in an inch or two of mineral-free water. It does not require a terrarium although it can benefit from one.

The ideal substrate is composed of 70% of blonde peat and 30% of non-calcareous sand. The ideal temperature varies between 5 and 15 °C in winter and between 20 and 40 °C in summer, for a hygrometry of 40 to 80%. Moist soil must be maintained year-round by the presence of a saucer under the pot, but watering must be reduced and the saucer removed in winter. High ambient humidity allows the preservation of mucilage. An exposure in full sun suits it perfectly, although a place a little less sunny may be suitable.

Invasive species
Drosera capensis is listed on the New Zealand National Pest Plant Accord due to it being classified as an invasive species in that country, where they cannot be bought at plant retailers and should not be traded by carnivorous plant partisans. They have been planted in the wild or unintentionally introduced through soil contaminated by seeds with plantings of pitcher plants and water lilies. They are now beginning to spread on their own, potentially with help from water birds.

Drosera capensis have also been found in Australia. Currently it has only been found in New South Wales but understanding the species distribution is essential to managing the species in the future. It has also been found in the state of California and classified as a naturalized weed. Alongside Australia, California and New Zealand, Drosera capensis have also been found in peat bogs in South America. It is currently classified as an invasive species.

References

External links

 Drosera capensis at PlantZAfrica.com
 General information on Drosera capensis at Plant of the Week

Carnivorous plants of Africa
capensis
Flora of the Cape Provinces
Plants described in 1753
Taxa named by Carl Linnaeus
Articles containing video clips